Drapetodes is a genus of moths belonging to the subfamily Drepaninae.

Species
 Drapetodes magnifica Swinhoe, 1902
 Drapetodes matulata Felder, 1874
 Drapetodes interlineata Warren, 1896
 Drapetodes mitaria Guenée, 1857
 Drapetodes fratercula Moore, 1887
 Drapetodes deumbrata Warren, 1922
 Drapetodes circumscripta Warren, 1922
 Drapetodes lunulata Warren, 1896
 Drapetodes croceago Hampson, 1895
 Drapetodes nummularia Snellen, 1889
 Drapetodes barlowi Holloway, 1998

References

Drepaninae
Drepanidae genera
Taxa named by Achille Guenée